Sarah Roy (born 27 February 1986) is an Australian professional racing cyclist, who currently rides for UCI Women's WorldTeam .

Before focussing on racing on the road in 2009, Roy was a triathlete, but injured herself six months later which resulted in knee surgery.

Major results

2014
 1st  Criterium, National Road Championships
2016
 1st Stage 4 Boels Rental Ladies Tour
2017
 1st SwissEver GP Cham-Hagendorn
 1st Stage 4 OVO Energy Women's Tour
 3rd GP de Plouay – Bretagne
 3rd Omloop van het Hageland
2018
 1st Gooik–Geraardsbergen–Gooik
 1st Stage 3 The Women's Tour
 2nd Criterium, National Road Championships
 5th Road race, Commonwealth Games
2019
 1st Clasica Femenina Navarra
 3rd Road race, National Road Championships
2020
 4th Gent–Wevelgem
 4th Three Days of Bruges–De Panne
 5th Tour of Flanders
 7th Overall Ceratizit Challenge by La Vuelta 
2021
 1st  Road race, National Road Championships
 7th Scheldeprijs
 8th Gent–Wevelgem
 10th GP Oetingen
2022
 3rd  Team relay, UCI Road World Championships
 8th Overall Bloeizone Fryslân Tour
 10th Ronde van Drenthe

See also
 List of 2015 UCI Women's Teams and riders

References

External links
 
 

1986 births
Living people
Australian female cyclists
Cyclists from Sydney
Cyclists at the 2018 Commonwealth Games
Commonwealth Games competitors for Australia
20th-century Australian women
21st-century Australian women